Awaiting Kirin  is a 2020 Japanese historical drama television series starring Hiroki Hasegawa as Akechi Mitsuhide, a samurai and general during the Sengoku period. The series is the 59th NHK taiga drama, premiering on January 19, 2020. It is the first regular taiga drama to be fully shot in 4K resolution, as well as the first taiga drama to be composed by a non-Japanese (John R. Graham).

Plot
The story is based on the life of Akechi Mitsuhide, a general under Oda Nobunaga.

Cast

Akechi clan
Hiroki Hasegawa as Akechi "Jūbei" Mitsuhide
Hinata Igarashi as young Mitsuhide
Fumino Kimura as Hiroko, Mitsuhide's wife
Mana Ashida as Tama, Mitsuhide's third daughter
Saki Takenoya as young Tama (about 10 years old)
Kokone Shimizu as young Tama (about 5 years old)
Nazuki Amano as Kishi, Mitsuhide's eldest daughter
Nanaka Hirao as young Kishi
Sayuri Ishikawa as Maki, Mitsuhide's mother
Masahiko Nishimura as Akechi Mitsuyasu, Mitsuhide's uncle
Satoshi Tokushige as Fujita Dengo
Shotaro Mamiya as Akechi Hidemitsu
Shinji Ozeki as Akechi Mitsutsuna, Mitsuhide's father
Takamasa Suga as Saitō Toshimitsu

Oda clan
Shōta Sometani as Oda Nobunaga
Katsunori Takahashi as Oda Nobuhide, Nobunaga's father
Rei Dan as Dota Gozen, Nobunaga's mother
Haruna Kawaguchi as Kichō, Saitō Dōsan's daughter, and the legal wife of Nobunaga
Ryo Kimura as Oda Nobuyuki (Nobukatsu), Nobunaga's younger brother 
Yasuomi Sano as Oda Nobuhiro, Nobunaga's half-brother
Houka Kinoshita as Oda Nobumitsu, Nobunaga's uncle
Yoshiaki Umegaki as Oda "Hikogorō" Nobutomo
Mizuki Inoue (HiHi Jets) as Oda Nobutada
Fūga Shibasaki as teen Nobutada (then known as Kimyōmaru)
Yahiro Katō as baby Nobutada (then known as Kimyōmaru)
Ayaka Imoto as Oichi, Nobunaga's younger sister
The vassals
Kuranosuke Sasaki as Hashiba Hideyoshi
Kōtarō Yoshida as Matsunaga Hisahide
Shōzō Uesugi as Hirate Masahide
Masanobu Ando as Shibata Katsuie
Jingi Irie as Maeda Toshiie
Yūsuke Suga as Sassa Narimasa
Kazuhiro Muroyama as Sakuma Morishige
Nobuaki Kaneko as Sakuma Nobumori
Tsubasa Imai as Mōri Shinsuke
Tsutomu Ikeda as Hattori Koheita
Kenshi Uchida as Yanada Masatsuna
Yoshihiro Nozoe as Chūjō Ietada
Takashi Hirota as Murai Sadakatsu
Kenji Matsuda as Niwa Nagahide
Yōhei Matsukado as Araki Murashige, Kishi's father-in-law
Mizuki Itagaki as Mori Ranmaru
Gaku Hamada as Kuroda Kanbei

Saitō clan
Masahiro Motoki as Saitō Dōsan, the "Viper of Mino"
Hideaki Itō as Saitō Yoshitatsu
Jun Hasegawa as Saitō Magoshirō
Naoki Inukai as Saitō Kiheiji
Kaho Minami as Miyoshino, Dōsan's concubine
Kyōko Kataoka as Omi no kata, Dōsan's legal wife 
Takehiro Murata as Inaba Yoshimichi (Inaba Ittetsu)
Kōki Yamamoto as Hineno Hironari

Hosokawa clan
Hidekazu Mashima as Hosokawa Fujitaka, Mitsuhide's best friend 
Shōsuke Tanihara as Mitsubuchi Fujihide
Ayumu Mochizuki as Hosokawa Tadaoki, Tama's husband

Imagawa clan
Kataoka Ainosuke VI as Imagawa Yoshimoto
Goro Ibuki as Taigen Sessai
Chikau Satō as Udono Nagateru
Makiya Yamaguchi as Asahina Chikanori

Tokugawa (Matsudaira) clan
Shunsuke Kazama as Tokugawa Ieyasu
Yūto Ikeda as Matsudaira Motonobu (Teen Ieyasu)
Ryusei Iwata as Takechiyo (Child Ieyasu)
Yosuke Asari as Matsudaira Hirotada, Ieyasu's father
Wakana Matsumoto as Odai no Kata, Ieyasu's mother
Eiji Yokota as Mizuno Nobumoto, Ieyasu's uncle
Kyōko Maya as Gen'ōni, a.k.a. Keyōin, Ieyasu's grandmother
Yuriko Ono as Lady Tsukiyama, Ieyasu's wife
Takashi Okamura as Kikumaru, a ninja

Toki clan
Toshinori Omi as Toki Yorinari
Masato Yano as Toki Yorizumi

Asakura clan
Yūsuke Santamaria as Asakura Yoshikage
Takaaki Enoki as Yamazaki Yoshiie
Tōru Tezuka as Asakura Kageaki
Yurito Mori as Kumagimimaru

Azai clan
Hiroto Kanai as Azai Nagamasa

Ashikaga shogunate
Kenichi Takitō as Ashikaga Yoshiaki, the 15th and final shōgun of the Ashikaga shogunate.
Osamu Mukai as Ashikaga Yoshiteru, the 13th shōgun
Hayate Ichinose as Ashikaga Yoshihide, the 14th shōgun
Tomiyuki Kunihiro as Hosokawa Harumoto
Tsurutaro Kataoka as Settsu Harukado
Shuhei Uesugi as Isshiki Fujinaga

Miyoshi clan
Kazuhiro Yamaji as Miyoshi Nagayoshi
Hiroyasu Kurobe as Miyoshi Yoshitsugu
Shōgo Miyahara as Miyoshi Nagayasu
Hiroki Takano as Iwanari Tomomichi
Kenji Oka as Miyoshi Sōi

Takeda clan
Ryo Ishibashi as Takeda Shingen

The imperial court
Bandō Tamasaburō V as Emperor Ōgimachi
Rui Sudō as Prince Michihito
Seishiro Kato as Prince Sanehito
Kanata Hongō as Konoe Sakihisa
Kazutoyo Koyabu as Nijō Haruyoshi
Renji Ishibashi as Sanjōnishi Sanezumi

Others
Mugi Kadowaki as Koma
Noa Tanaka as young Koma
Masaaki Sakai as Dr. Mochizuki Tōan 
Machiko Ono as Iroha-dayū
Yua Tanaka as young Iroha-dayū
Takanori Jinnai as Imai Sōkyū
Shunpūtei Koasa as Kakujo
Taro Suruga as Tsutsui Junkei
Yasukaze Motomiya as a bandit leader
Reo Tamaoki as Iheiji
Akio Ōtsuka as Sōjirō
Bengal as Hōjin
Takayuki Hamatsu as a seller of tea
Manabu Hosoi as an old man
Jiyū Arima as Shiba Yoshimune
Shū Matsuda as Shiba Yoshikane
Guin Poon Chaw as Naka, Hideyoshi's mother
Kenichi Ogata as a monk
Kozo Takeda as Kennyo
Mansour Fakher as a missionary
Shin'ichi Shirahata as Hatano Hideharu
Mutsumi Sasaki as Nikkai

Production
Production Credits
Music – John R. Graham
Titling – Suitō Nakatsuka
Historical research – Tetsuo Owada
Costume designer – Kazuko Kurosawa

On April 19, 2018, NHK announced Kirin ga Kuru as its 59th taiga drama, starring Hiroki Hasegawa as Akechi Mitsuhide, a samurai and general during the Sengoku period, with Shunsaku Ikehata as writer. Ikehata previously wrote the 29th taiga drama, Taiheki (1991). The drama aims to shed light on the first half of Akechi's life, of which little is known about due to lacking historical records. On March 8, 2019, NHK announced that John R. Graham will be Kirin ga Kurus composer, having previously been a composer for Kingsglaive: Final Fantasy XV; he is the first American hired to compose the score and the main theme of a taiga drama. Meanwhile, Junichi Hirokami acts as conductor of the NHK Symphony Orchestra. Historical researcher Tetsuo Owada, a professor emeritus at Shizuoka University who specializes in the Sengoku period of Japanese history, previously advised taiga dramas such as Hideyoshi (1996), Tenchijin (2009), and Gunshi Kanbei (2014).

Casting
After Hasegawa, the rest of the main cast was announced on March 8, 2019, which included Mugi Kadowaki, Takashi Okamura, Sayuri Ishikawa, Masahiko Nishimura, Katsunori Takahashi, Erika Sawajiri, and Masahiro Motoki among others. The second cast announcement on June 17, 2019 included Fumino Kimura as Hiroko, as well as Kaho Minami, Takehiro Murata, Satoshi Tokushige, Kataoka Ainosuke VI, Rei Dan, and Kuranosuke Sasaki. The third cast announcement on August 7, 2019 included Machiko Ono, Osamu Mukai, Shunsuke Kazama, and Goro Ibuki. Ono previously had the main roles in Ashio Kara Kita Onna (2014) and Natsume Soseki no Tsuma (2016), two NHK drama series written by Shunsaku Ikehata. The fourth cast announcement on February 19, 2020 included Yūsuke Santamaria, Shotaro Mamiya, Kanata Hongō, Masanobu Ando, Kyōko Maya, and Bengal.

Filming
The usual taiga drama production would first have one-third of the expected number of scripts finished before shooting begins. Afterwards, audience reception is taken into account as the rest of the series is written.

Shooting for the series began on June 3, 2019. Kirin ga Kuru is the first regular taiga drama to be fully shot in 4K resolution. Chief producer Masaru Ochiai stated that the colorful costumes to be worn are made with adherence to feng shui.

On November 16, 2019, Erika Sawajiri, playing Oda Nobunaga's wife Kichō, was arrested over MDMA possession. She was replaced by Haruna Kawaguchi five days after being taken into custody. The series' start date was delayed by a fortnight as all of Sawajiri's scenes in the first 10 episodes – along with advertising and promotional footage – had to be reshot.

On April 1, 2020, NHK announced that filming schedules for both Kirin ga Kuru and Yell were cancelled until April 12 to consider the safety of performers and staff during the COVID-19 pandemic. By April 7, NHK extended the cancellation of shooting for both series after Prime Minister Shinzo Abe proclaimed a one-month state of emergency for Tokyo and other prefectures. The series resumed on August 30, 2020.

Reception
According to Kaori Shoji of The Japan Times, observers during the reshoots of the first 10 episodes criticized Haruna Kawaguchi's performance as being "too flimsy".

Ryusei Iwata's performance as Takechiyo, the child Ieyasu, has received praise from viewers online.

TV schedule

Highlight

Soundtrack
Kirin ga Kuru NHK Taiga Drama Original Soundtrack Vol. 1 (January 29, 2020)
Kirin ga Kuru NHK Taiga Drama Original Soundtrack Vol. 2
Kirin ga Kuru NHK Taiga Drama Original Soundtrack Vol. 3 (December 23, 2020)

Accolades

See also

Sengoku period

Notes

References

External links
Official Site 

Taiga drama
2020 Japanese television series debuts
2021 Japanese television series endings
Cultural depictions of Akechi Mitsuhide
Cultural depictions of Oda Nobunaga
Cultural depictions of Tokugawa Ieyasu
Cultural depictions of Toyotomi Hideyoshi
Television productions suspended due to the COVID-19 pandemic
Television series set in the 16th century